The Philippine Basketball Association (PBA) Mythical Team is an honor given annually  to the best players in each of the five basketball positions: point guard, shooting guard, small forward, power forward and center. A Second Mythical Team was institutionalized in 1984.

Selections

Most selections 
The following table only lists players with at least five total selections.

Notes 

Mythical Team
Awards established in 1975
1975 establishments in the Philippines